Andrew Dowell (born November 16, 1996) is an American football linebacker for the New Orleans Saints of the National Football League (NFL). He played college football at Michigan State.

College career
Dowell played 13 games as a true freshman, mainly on special teams, leading the team with 10 tackles on specials teams. As a sophomore he made eight starts at linebacker and as a junior started all 13 games as a star linebacker, ranking second on the team with 74 tackles. During his senior season he earned an honorable mention for the All-Big Ten by coaches and media, and earned the MSU Tommy Love Award for most improved player on defense. He again started all 13 games at linebacker, making 97 tackles (ranking him 10th in the Big Ten) along with career high tackles for losses (8.5), pass break-ups (9) and sacks (3.5). While at Michigan State, he played alongside his twin-brother David.

Professional career

Dallas Cowboys
Dowell was signed by the Dallas Cowboys as an undrafted free agent on May 1, 2019. He was waived by Dallas, with an injury designation, on August 1, 2019. He was waived from injured reserve on August 10, 2019.

New Orleans Saints
Dowell signed to the New Orleans Saints' practice squad on November 20, 2019. He signed a reserve/future contract with the Saints on January 7, 2020. He was waived during final roster cuts on September 5, 2020, and signed to the practice squad the next day. He was elevated to the active roster on January 2, 2021, for the team's week 17 game against the Carolina Panthers, and reverted to the practice squad after the game. On January 18, 2021, he signed a reserve/future contract at the conclusion of the 2020 season.

2021 season
Dowell made the New Orleans Saints' 53-man roster following the 2021 training camp. On September 26, 2021, in week 3, he blocked a punt against the New England Patriots' punter Jake Bailey in the second-quarter. On December 19, 2021, in a week 15 matchup against the Tampa Bay Buccaneers Dowell became the first NFL player in 2021 to record 5 special teams stops (four solo) in a single game. He played in 16 games and finished the 2021 regular season tied for fourth in the league with 15 special teams tackles.

References

External links
New Orleans Saints bio
Michigan State Spartans football bio

1996 births
Living people
Players of American football from Ohio
American football linebackers
Michigan State Spartans football players
Dallas Cowboys players
New Orleans Saints players